Saint Alphage  may refer to:
 "St Alphage", the parish church of Burnt Oak in the northwest London, England
 St Alphage London Wall, the remains of a church originally built in 1532 adjacent to a remaining section of the London Wall 
 Alphege (954–1012), (sometimes spelled as "Alphage" or Ælfheah) Archbishop of Canterbury